Save Me 2 is a 2019 South Korean television series starring Uhm Tae-goo, Chun Ho-jin, Esom and Kim Young-min. It is the sequel to the 2017 series Save Me and is based on the 2013 animation movie The Fake. The series aired on OCN's Wednesdays and Thursdays at 23:00 KST time slot from May 8 to June 27, 2019.

Synopsis
A pseudo-religious group sows discord in the village of Wolchoori.

Cast

Main
 Uhm Tae-goo as Kim Min-chul
 Chun Ho-jin as Choi Kyung-suk
 Esom as Kim Young-sun
 Kim Young-min as Sung Chul-woo

Supporting
 Im Ha-ryong as Park Duk-ho
 Sung Hyuk as Jung Byung-ryul
 Han Sun-hwa as Go Eun-ah
 Jo Jae-yoon as Shin Pil-goo
 Woo Hyun as Boongeo
 Oh Yeon-ah as Jin-sook
 Jang Won-young as Chil-sung
 Kim Soo-jin as Chil-sung's wife
 Jeon Ji-hoo as Choi Ji Woong
 Seo Woo-jin as Seo-joon

Production
The first script reading took place in February 2019 in Sangam, Seoul, South Korea.

Ratings

References

External links
  
 

OCN television dramas
Korean-language television shows
2019 South Korean television series debuts
2019 South Korean television series endings
South Korean thriller television series
South Korean mystery television series
Television series by Studio Dragon
Sequel television series
Television series by Hidden Sequence